The 2009 Sun Belt Conference football season was an NCAA football season that was played from September 3, 2009, to January 6, 2010. The Sun Belt Conference consists of 9 football members:  Arkansas State, Florida Atlantic, Florida International, Louisiana-Lafayette, Louisiana-Monroe, Middle Tennessee, North Texas, Troy, and Western Kentucky who becomes a full-time member in 2009 after 2 seasons as an independent and conditional member who played a limited Sun Belt schedule after transitioning from the Football Championship Subdivision. Troy won the Sun Belt Championship and played in the GMAC Bowl where they lost in two overtimes to Central Michigan. Middle Tennessee was the only other Sun Belt member to be invited to a bowl game, the New Orleans Bowl, where they defeated Southern Mississippi.

Previous season 
Troy (8-5) were the Sun Belt champions and lost to Southern Mississippi in the R+L Carriers New Orleans Bowl 30-27.
 
Three other Sun Belt teams, Arkansas State, Florida Atlantic, and Louisiana-Lafayette, were bowl eligible with records of 6-6, but only Florida Atlantic was invited to a bowl game, the Motor City Bowl defeating Central Michigan 24-21.

Preseason

Preseason poll 
The 2009 Sun Belt coaches preseason poll was announced during a two-day media web-based event on July 20 and 21. Defending champion Troy was selected as the favorite to win the conference.

Sun Belt Coaches Poll
 Troy – 72 (5)
 Arkansas State – 69
 Florida Atlantic – 61 (1)
 Middle Tennessee – 52 
 Florida International - 43 (1)
 Louisiana-Lafayette – 39 (1)
 Louisiana-Monroe – 34 (1) 
 North Texas – 18
 Western Kentucky - 17

Award watch lists

Regular season 

All times reflect the local time for that team (Central Time-Arkansas State, Louisiana-Lafayette, Louisiana-Monroe, Middle Tennessee, North Texas and Troy. Eastern Time- Florida Atlantic, Florida International, Western Kentucky). Conference games times are that of the home team.

Rankings reflect that of the USA Today Coaches poll for that week until week eight when the BCS rankings will be used.

Week One

Week Two

Week Three

Week Four

Week Five

Week Six

Week Seven

Week Eight

Week Nine

Week Ten

Week Eleven

Week Twelve

Week Thirteen

Week Fourteen

Bowl games

Attendance

References